The North Kimberley Marine Park is the largest state-managed marine park in Western Australia and second largest in Australia. covering  or  about  north-east of Derby. It is located in the Indian Ocean and the Timor Sea, extending from York Sound north-eastwards to the WA border with the Northern Territory.

The park helps to protect the features such as coral reefs, mangroves and beaches, and species such as dugongs, whales, dolphins, sawfish and turtles that inhabit the sea within its boundaries. The Balanggarra, Wunambal Gaambera, Ngarinyin and Miriuwung/ Gajerrong peoples have deep connections to the country, and Balanggarra traditional owners will co-manage part of the park with the Department of Parks and Wildlife. A ten-year management plan was released on 17 December 2018.

The park includes King George River, with its  twin waterfalls, and Cape Londonderry, the northernmost point of Western Australia.

See also

List of marine parks in Australia (incomplete)

References

Australian marine parks